is a Japanese instructor of Shotokan karate.  He has won the JKA All-Japan championships for kumite. He is currently an instructor of the Japan Karate Association.

Biography
Yusuke Inokoshi was born in Tochigi Prefecture, Japan on 20 July 1980. His karate training began during his 6 years old and he studied at Komazawa University.

Competition
Yusuke Inokoshi has had considerable success in karate competition.

Major Tournament Success
 52nd JKA All Japan Karate Championship (2009) – 1st Place Kumite
 51st JKA All Japan Karate Championship (2008) – 2nd Place Kumite

References

1980 births
Living people
Japanese male karateka
Karate coaches
Shotokan practitioners
Sportspeople from Tochigi Prefecture
Komazawa University alumni
World Games bronze medalists
Competitors at the 2001 World Games
World Games medalists in karate